One Morning In May is a solo jazz guitar album by Bucky Pizzarelli of jazz standards, released in 2001 by Arbors Records.

Track listing

 Guess I'll Go Back Home – 2:15
 One Morning in May – 2:17
 Laura – 3:04
 A Blues Serenade – 3:09
 Candle Lights – 5:20
 This Nearly Was Mine – 1:58
 Serenata – 2:50
 Lush Life – 3:08
 A Flower Is a Lovesome Thing – 2:04
 Wait Till You See Her – 2:49
 Bess, You Is My Woman Now – 2:17
 In a Mist – 4:46
 Blood Count – 2:50
 All This and Heaven Too – 1:54
 Warm Valley – 2:43
 Stars in Your Eyes – 1:42
 Cottage for Sale – 3:10
 Old Folks – 1:43
 Autumn Nocturne – 2:38
 Someone to Watch Over Me – 2:36
 Goodbye – 2:02

Personnel
Bucky Pizzarelli – guitar
Jay Dittamo – engineer

Reception

Ronnie D. Lankford Jr. reviewed the album for AllMusic, commenting that it "should appeal to anyone who enjoys quality guitar jazz, and will certainly appeal to Pizzarelli's fans."

References

2001 albums
Bucky Pizzarelli albums
Swing albums
Arbors Records albums
Instrumental albums